Strubiny may refer to the following places:
Strubiny, Nowy Dwór Mazowiecki County in Masovian Voivodeship (east-central Poland)
Strubiny, Płońsk County in Masovian Voivodeship (east-central Poland)
Strubiny, Warmian-Masurian Voivodeship (north Poland)